"Three Minute Hero" is a song and single written by Neol Davies and performed by English 2 tone ska revival band the Selecter. It is the opening track on side one of their album Too Much Pressure. Released in 1980, the song reached number 16 on the UK charts, staying there for six weeks.

References

External links
 

1980 singles
1980 songs
The Selecter songs
2 Tone Records singles
Songs written by Neol Davies